The Nebraska Territorial Legislature was held from January 16, 1855 until 1865 in Omaha City, Nebraska Territory.

Major issues

Slavery 

In 1854 the Kansas–Nebraska Act created the Nebraska Territory, overturning the Missouri Compromise by allowing legislatures of the Nebraska and Kansas territories to determine whether to permit or abolish slavery. Slavery was a contentious issue for the territorial legislature between the creation of the Territory in 1854 and the outbreak of the American Civil War in 1861.

State capitol 

After serving as the territorial capital for ten years, Omaha City wanted to be the capital of the new state. In 1854 land speculators formed the Omaha Claim Club as part of a scheme to persuade territory legislators to keep the capital in Omaha. Their aggressive efforts to secure land to give away to legislators led to the platting of Scriptown. However, their bid failed, and in 1865 the state capitol moved to Lincoln.

Sessions

1855 

The new legislature immediately passed the Free Public School Act of 1855, which created free public schools for children across the territory. Positions for a territorial superintendent and county school superintendents to be elected by popular vote were also created. County superintendents were supposed to organize school districts and levy property taxes to support schools; however, not every locale levied the taxes or built schools.

The first incorporated city in Nebraska, Nebraska City, was granted its charter by a special act in 1855.

1856 

In January 1856, the territorial legislature chartered the Bank of Florence, which failed three years later.

1857 

On February 11 the territorial legislature gave permission to a group of citizens to found the University of Nebraska at Saratoga, Nebraska. However, when they did not complete the task of meeting in Saratoga and establishing a campus within one year they lost their permission to charter.

1858 

In January, 1858 a group of representatives illegally moved the territorial legislature to Florence following a violent outburst at the capitol building. After repeatedly being dogged out of voting on the removal of the capital from Omaha, a skirmish pitted representatives from Nebraska City, Florence, and other communities to convene outside of Omaha. Despite having a majority of members present for the vote to remove the capital and all agreeing, the "Florence Legislature" did not succeed in swaying the Nebraska Territory governor.  The capital remained at Omaha until 1867 when Nebraska gained statehood.

1860 

In early 1860 the territorial legislature authorized a special election to consider forming a state constitution, which did not pass.

1864 

The territorial legislature had a variety of powers, including granting every incorporated town or city its charter, which lasted through the 1864 session, when the first general incorporation act was passed and signed by the governor.

1866 

Six years later, on January 9, 1866 the territorial Governor Alvin Saunders urged the Legislature to consider statehood.

Municipal incorporations 

The territorial legislature had the sole power of incorporating every municipality throughout the territory until 1864. A number of incorporations existed only on paper and were never actually settled. In 1864, the first general incorporation act was passed by the legislature and signed by the governor which allowed county commissioners to incorporate towns.

References

External links
 "Nebraska as a Territory," History of the State of Nebraska, Chicago: A. T. Andreas, 1882.
 "History of Nebraska"
 "History of Nebraska State Government Organization"

Bibliography 
 Berens, C. (2005) One house: The Unicameral's progressive vision for Nebraska. University of Nebraska Press.

Nebraska Territory
Former territorial legislatures of the United States
1854 establishments in Nebraska Territory
1865 disestablishments in Nebraska Territory